One Park Avenue (EP 07 Tower) or East Park 07 Tower is a supertall skyscraper proposed for construction in Dubai, UAE. The tower would be energy efficient, and use green building elements, for example by pumping air from the cooler top floors down to the warmer bottom floors. The 125-story building has a curvy design which contains steel ribbons for solar power generation. At times, the tower can generate more than enough electricity for itself. The excess energy will be sent to other buildings and the rest of Dubai. EP 07 Tower is just one tower out of the proposed East Park/Atrium City Towers development, which will include as many as five buildings with more than 100 floors, including EP 07 Tower.

See also
List of tallest buildings in Dubai

References

External links
East Park / Atrium City Towers on SkyscraperPage Forum

Proposed skyscrapers in Dubai